Duncan Lindsay (4 April 1902 – 8 September 1967) was an Australian rules footballer who played with North Melbourne in the Victorian Football League (VFL).

Notes

External links 

1902 births
1967 deaths
Australian rules footballers from Melbourne
Australian Rules footballers: place kick exponents
North Melbourne Football Club players
People from Footscray, Victoria